Adansonia is a genus made up of eight species of medium-to-large deciduous trees known as baobabs ( or ). They are placed in the Malvaceae family, subfamily Bombacoideae. They are native to Madagascar, mainland Africa, and Australia. The trees have also been introduced to other regions such as Asia. The generic name honours Michel Adanson, the French naturalist and explorer who described Adansonia digitata. The baobab is also known as the "upside down tree", a name that originates from several myths. They are among the most long-lived of vascular plants and have large flowers that are reproductive for a maximum of 15 hours. The flowers open around dusk, opening so quickly that movement can be detected by the naked eye, and are faded by the next morning. The fruits are large, oval to round and berry-like and hold kidney-shaped seeds in a dry, pulpy matrix.

In the early 21st century, baobabs in southern Africa began to die off rapidly from a cause yet to be determined. It is unlikely that disease or pests would be able to kill many trees so rapidly, and some have speculated that the die-off is a result of dehydration.

Description

General

Young trees usually have slender, tapering trunks, often with a swollen base. Mature trees have massive trunks that are bottle-shaped or cylindrical and tapered from bottom to top. The trunk is made of fibrous wood arranged in concentric rings, although rings are not always formed annually and so cannot be used to determine the age of individual trees. Tree diameter fluctuates with rainfall so it is thought that water may be stored in the trunk. Baobab trees have two types of shoots—long, green vegetative ones, and stout, woody reproductive ones. Branches can be massive and spread out horizontal from the trunk or are ascending. Adansonia rubrostipa is the only baobab that sometimes has spines. A. digitata, however, often has massive single or multiple trunks of up to  diameter.

Leaves
Leaves are palmately compound in mature trees, but seedlings and regenerating shoots may have simple leaves. The transition to compound leaves comes with age and may be gradual. Leaves have 5–11 leaflets, with the largest ones in the middle and may be stalkless or with short petioles. Leaflets may have toothed or smooth edges, and may be hairless or have simple-to-clumped hairs. Baobabs have stipules at the base of the leaves, but the stipules are soon shed in most species. Baobabs are deciduous, shedding leaves during the dry season.

Flowers

In most Adansonia species, the flowers are born on short erect or spreading stalks in the axils of the leaves near the tips of reproductive shoots. Only A. digitata has flowers and fruits set on long, hanging stalks. There is usually only a single flower in an axil, but sometimes flowers occur in pairs. They are large, showy and strongly scented. They only open near dusk. Opening is rapid and movement of the flower parts is fast enough to be visible. Most Adansonia species are pollinated by bats. Flowers may remain attached to the trees for several days, but the reproductive phase is very short, with pollen shed during the first night and stigmas shriveled by the morning. The flower is made up of an outer 5-lobed calyx, and an inner ring of petals set around a fused tube of stamens. The outer lobes of the calyx are usually green (brown in A. grandidieri) and in bud are joined almost to the tip. As the flower opens, the calyx lobes split apart and become coiled or bent back (reflexed) at the base of the flower. The inner surface of the lobes are silky-hairy and cream, pink, or red. Sometimes the lobes do not separate cleanly, distorting the shape of the flower as they bend back. The calyx lobes remain fused at the base, leaving a feature (calyx tube) that has nectar-producing tissue and that is cup-shaped, flat or tubular; the form of the calyx tube varies with species. The flowers have a central tube (staminal tube) made up of fused stalks of stamens (filaments), with unfused filaments above. A densely hairy ovary is enclosed in the staminal tube, and a long style tipped with a stigma emerges from the filaments. Petals are set near the base of the staminal tube and are variable in shape and colour. The flowers, when fresh, may be white, cream, bright yellow or dark red, but fade quickly, often turning reddish when dried.

Fruit
The fruit of the baobabs is one of their distinguishing features. It has a dry, hard outer shell of variable thickness. In most species, the shell is indehiscent (does not break open easily). A. gibbosa is the only species with fruits that crack while still on the tree, which then tend to break open upon landing on the ground. Inside the outer shell, kidney-shaped seeds 10-15(-20) mm long are set in a dry pulp.

Taxonomy
The earliest written reports of baobab are from a 14th-century travelogue by the Arab traveler Ibn Batuta. The first botanical description was by Alpino (1592), looking at fruits that he observed in Egypt from an unknown source. They were called Bahobab, possibly from the Arabic "bu hibab", meaning "many-seeded fruit". The French explorer and botanist Michel Adanson (1727–1806) observed a baobab tree in 1749 on the island of Sor in Senegal, and wrote the first detailed botanical description of the full tree, accompanied with illustrations. Recognizing the connection to the fruit described by Alpino he called the genus Baobab. Linnaeus later renamed the genus Adansonia, to honour Adason, but use of baobab as one of the common names has persisted.

The genus Adansonia is in the subfamily Bombacoideae, within the family Malvaceae in the order Malvales. The subfamily Bombacoideae was previously treated as the Bombacaceae family but it is no longer recognized at the rank of family by the Angiosperm Phylogeny Group I 1998, II 2003 or the Kubitzki system 2003. There are eight accepted species of Adansonia. A new species (Adansonia kilima Pettigrew, et al.), was described in 2012, found in high-elevation sites in eastern and southern Africa. This, however, is no longer recognized as a distinct species  but considered a synonym of A. digitata. Some high-elevation trees in Tanzania show different genetics and morphology, but further study is needed to determine if recognition of them as a separate species is warranted. The genus Adansonia is further divided into three sections. Section Adansonia includes only A. digitata. This species has hanging flowers and fruit, set on long flowering stalks. This is the type species for the genus Adansonia.  All species of Adansonia except A. digitata are diploid; A. digitata is tetraploid. Section Brevitubae includes A. grandidieri and A. suarexensis. These are species with flower buds that set on short pedicles and that are approximately twice as long as wide. The other species are all classified within the section Longitubae. They also have flowers/fruits set on short pedicels, but the flower buds are five or more times as long as wide.

Species

, there are eight recognized species of Adansonia, with six endemic to Madagascar, one native to mainland Africa and the Arabian Peninsula, and one native to Australia. The mainland African species (Adansonia digitata) also occurs on Madagascar, but it is not a native of that island. Baobabs were introduced in ancient times to south Asia and during the colonial era to the Caribbean. They are also present in the island nation of Cape Verde. A ninth species was described in 2012 (Adansonia kilima Pettigrew, et al.) but is no longer recognized as a distinct species. The African and Australian baobabs are similar in appearance, and the oldest splits within Adansonia are likely no older than 15 million years; thus, the Australian species represents a long-distance trans-oceanic dispersal event from Africa. The lineage leading to Adansonia was found to have diverged from its closest relatives in Bombacoideae like Ceiba /Chorisia at the end of the Eocene, during a time of abrupt global climate cooling and drying, while a divergence of this Adansonia+Ceiba /Chorisia clade from Pachira was found to be more ancient, dating to the middle Eocene.

Habitat
The Malagasy species are important components of the Madagascar dry deciduous forests. Within that biome, Adansonia madagascariensis and A. rubrostipa occur specifically in the Anjajavy Forest, sometimes growing out of the tsingy limestone itself. A. digitata has been called "a defining icon of African bushland". The tree also grows wild in Sudan in the regions of Darfur and the state of Kordofan. The locals call it "Gongolaze" and use its fruits as food and medicine and use the tree trunks as reservoirs to save water.

Ecology
Baobabs store water in the trunk (up to ) to endure harsh drought conditions. All occur in seasonally arid areas, and are deciduous, shedding their leaves during the dry season. Across Africa, the oldest and largest baobabs began to die in the early 21st century, likely from a combination of drought and rising temperatures. The trees appear to become parched, then become dehydrated and unable to support their massive trunks.

Baobabs are important as nest sites for birds, in particular the mottled spinetail and four species of weaver.

Notable trees

Radiocarbon dating has provided data on a few individuals of A. digitata. The Panke baobab in Zimbabwe was some 2,450 years old when it died in 2011, making it the oldest angiosperm ever documented, and two other trees—Dorslandboom in Namibia and Glencoe in South Africa—were estimated to be approximately 2,000 years old. Another specimen known as Grootboom was dated and found to be at least 1,275 years old. The tree has since split into two parts, so the widest individual trunk may now be that of the Sunland baobab, or Platland tree, also in South Africa.

Two large baobabs growing in Tsimanampetsotse National Park were also studied using radiocarbon dating. One called Grandmother is made up of three fused trunks of different ages, with the oldest part of the tree an estimated 1,600 years old. The second, "polygamous baobab", has six fused stems, and is an estimated 1,000 years old.

Food uses

Leaves
The tree's leaves may be eaten as a leaf vegetable.

Fruit
 The white pith in the fruit of the Australian baobab (A. gregorii) tastes like sherbet. It has an acidic, tart, citrus flavor. It is a good source of vitamin C, potassium, carbohydrates, and phosphorus.
 The dried fruit powder of A. digitata, baobab powder, contains about 11% water, 80% carbohydrates (50% fiber), and modest levels of various nutrients, including riboflavin, calcium, magnesium, potassium, iron, and phytosterols, with low levels of protein and fats. In 2008, baobab dried fruit pulp was authorized in the EU as a safe food ingredient, and later in the year was granted GRAS (generally recognized as safe) status in the United States.
 In Angola, the dry fruit of A. digitata is usually boiled, and the broth is used for juices or as the base for a type of ice cream known as gelado de múcua. 
 In Zimbabwe, the fruit of A. digitata is eaten fresh or the crushed crumbly pulp is stirred into porridge and drinks.
 In Tanzania, the dry pulp of A. digitata is added to sugarcane to aid fermentation in brewing (beermaking).

Seed
 The seeds of some species are a source of vegetable oil.
 The fruit pulp and seeds of A. grandidieri and A. za are eaten fresh.

Other uses
Some baobab species are sources of fiber, dye, and fuel. Indigenous Australians used the native species A. gregorii for several products, making string from the root fibers and decorative crafts from the fruits. Baobab oil from the seed is also used in cosmetics, particularly in moisturizers.

Gallery

References

External links

 
Malvaceae genera
Taxa named by Carl Linnaeus
Fruits originating in Africa
Fruits originating in Australia